Naidupet or Naidupeta or Nayudupeta is a town in Tirupati district of the Andhra Pradesh state of India. It also the mandal headquarters of Naidupeta mandal, and it is located in Sullurupeta revenue division.

Transport 

The Andhra Pradesh State Road Transport Corporation operates bus services from Naidupet bus station.

Naidupet has a railway station on Chennai - Hyderabad route operated by Southern Railways.

References

Towns in Tirupati district
Mandal headquarters in Tirupati district